James Gillespie may refer to:

 James Gillespie (politician) (c. 1747–1805), U.S. Congressman from North Carolina
 James Gillespie (minister) (1720–1791), Scottish minister and theologian
 James Gillespie (footballer) (c. 1870–?), Scottish footballer
 James Gillespie (philanthropist) (1726–1797), Scottish snuff and tobacco merchant
James Gillespie (mariner), HM Excise officer and commander of the cutter Henry Dundas

See also 
 Jim Gillespie (disambiguation)
 James G. Blaine (James Gillespie Blaine), American politician and United States Secretary of State
 James G. Birney (James Gillespie Birney), American abolitionist, politician, and Liberty Party nominee for President